The 2021 Iranian Super Cup was the 7th Iranian Super Cup, an annual football match played between the winners of the previous season's Persian Gulf Pro League, Persepolis, and the previous season's Hazfi Cup, Foolad.

Persepolis were the defending champions as winners of the 2020 Iranian Super Cup.

Foolad defeated Persepolis 1–0 to win their first title.

Teams

Match

Details

See also
 2020–21 Persian Gulf Pro League
 2020-21 Hazfi Cup

References

2021
Iranian Super Cup
Persepolis F.C. matches